Kingston Falls  were an American Christian hardcore band, and they primarily played hardcore punk and metalcore. They were from Goshen, Indiana, where they formed in 2003 and disbanded in 2009. The primary members of the band were John Busenbark (vocals), Brent Zebell (Drums), Josiah Gaut (Guitar), Josh Battles (Guitar), and Jason Gough (Bass). They released three independently made extended plays; Seasons of Despair (2003), Kingston Falls (2004), and Crusader (2005). Their first studio album, The Crescendo of Sirens, was released by Strike First Records, in 2006. The subsequent and last studio album, Armada on Mercury, was released by Facedown Records, in 2008.

Background
Kingston Falls was a Christian hardcore and Christian metal band that hailed from Goshen, Indiana. From conception through "The Crescendo of Sirens" album, the members were John Busenbark (vocals), Brent Zebell (drums), Josh Battles (guitar), Josiah Gaut (guitar), and Jason Gough (bass, Beyond the Fathoms). Following the release of "The Crescendo of Sirens" in 2006, the band experienced some turnover and volatility in its membership, cycling all contributors except Brent and Josiah by the time the band disbanded.

Music history
The band commenced as a musical entity in 2003,. They released three albums independently before signing with Facedown imprint Strike First Records. These first three albums were "Seasons of Despair" (2003), Kingston Falls (2004) and, Crusader (2005). Their first studio album, The Crescendo of Sirens, was released by Strike First Records, on April 4, 2006. The subsequent studio album, Armada on Mercury, was released by Facedown Records, on March 18, 2008.

Members
Last Known Line-up
 Brent Zebell – Drums (2003-2009) 
 Josiah Gaut – Guitar (2003-2009) 
Past Members 
 Jason Gough – Bass (2003-2006) 
 Josh Battles – Guitar (2003-2008)
 Bill Bowers – Bass (2006-2008)
 John Busenbark – Vocals (2004-2006)
 Nate Lambright Dale – Vocals (2006-2008)
 Justin Gibson – Vocals (2003-2004)
 Line-Up for Post-2011 Reunion Shows
 John Busenbark - Vocals
 Brent Zebell - Drums 
 Josiah Gaut - Guitar 
 Bill Bowers - Bass

Discography
Studio albums
 The Crescendo of Sirens (April 4, 2006, Strike First)
 Armada on Mercury (March 18, 2008, Facedown)

References

External links
 Cross Rhythms artist profile

Musical groups from Indiana
2002 establishments in Indiana
2009 disestablishments in Indiana
Musical groups established in 2002
Musical groups disestablished in 2009
Facedown Records artists
Strike First Records artists